This is a list of top NCAA Division I Men's basketball teams ranked by the number of wins through the end of the last completed season, 2021–22.

References
NCAA's 2022 Division I Men's Basketball Records ("All Time Winningest Schools" through the 2021-2022 season begins on page 72.)

List of vacated and forfeited games in college basketball

College men's basketball records and statistics in the United States